Thorkild Hansen  (9 January 1927 – 4 February 1989) was a Danish novelist most noted for his  historical fiction.
He is popularly known for his trilogy of novels about the Danish slave trade which is composed of Coast of Slaves (1967), Ships of Slaves (1968), and Islands of Slaves (1970; for which he received the Nordic Council Literature Prize in 1971).

Biography
Hansen was born at Ordrup in Gentofte Municipality, Denmark. He attended  Holte Gymnasium and from 1945-47 studied literature at the University of Copenhagen. In 1947, he moved  to Paris where he wrote dispatches for the Copenhagen-based  Ekstra Bladet. After returning to Denmark in 1952, he devoted his efforts to a series of novels. Several featured aspects of the Danish era of imperialism. Det Lykkelige Arabien: En Dansk Ekspedition (1962) covered the Danish Arabia expedition (1761–67) led by Carsten Niebuhr. His book Jens Munk (1965) was about Danish-Norwegian sea captain  Jens Munk and his attempt to locate the Northwest Passage.

  

He died prematurely during a voyage in the Caribbean.

Awards
Søren Gyldendal Prize (1963)
De Gyldne Laurbær (1966)
Nordic Council Literature Prize  (1971)

Selected works
Resten er Stilhed (1953)
 Arabia Felix: The Danish Expedition of 1761-1767 (Det Lykkelige Arabien: En Dansk Ekspedition, 1761 67 , 1962) 
 Coast of Slaves (Slavernes kyst, 1967)
 Ships of Slaves (Slavernes skibe, 1968)
 The Way to Hudson Bay: The Life and Times of Jens Munk
 Islands of Slaves (Slavernes øer, 1970)
 Processen mod Hamsun, (1978)

References

External links
Thorkild Hansen  Gyldendal 

1927 births
1989 deaths
People from Gentofte Municipality
University of Copenhagen alumni
Danish male novelists
20th-century Danish memoirists
Knut Hamsun researchers
Nordic Council Literature Prize winners
20th-century Danish novelists